Frederik Harold Dubord (December 14, 1891 – October 14, 1964) was an American attorney and politician from Maine. Dubord served five terms as the mayor of Waterville, Maine, from 1928 to 1932. In 1936, Dubord was the Maine Democratic Party's nominee for governor, which he lost to Republican Lewis O. Barrows.

On June 29, 1955, Dubord was appointed as a justice to the Maine Superior Court by old friend and governor Edmund Muskie. A year later, on October 4, 1956, he was appointed to the Maine Supreme Judicial Court. He retired from that position on December 10, 1962.

References

1891 births
1964 deaths
Mayors of Waterville, Maine
Maine Democrats
Maine lawyers
Justices of the Maine Supreme Judicial Court
20th-century American judges
20th-century American lawyers